The 2004 United States Senate election in North Dakota  was held on November 2, 2004, concurrent with other elections for president, the United States House of Representatives, and various state and local offices. Incumbent Democratic-NPL U.S. Senator Byron Dorgan won re-election to a third term by a landslide margin of 36.6 percentage points, sweeping every county in the state, even while Democratic presidential nominee John Kerry lost the state by 27.3 percentage points.

Candidates

Democratic-NPL 
 Byron Dorgan, incumbent U.S. Senator

Republican 
 Mike Liffrig, attorney

General election

Predictions

Results

See also 
 2004 United States Senate elections

References

External links 
 2004 North Dakota U.S. Senate Election results

2004 North Dakota elections
North Dakota
2004